The Gornja Jošanica massacre occurred in village Gornja Jošanica, near Foča in eastern Bosnia, where 56 Serbian civilians were killed during an attack by the Army of the Republic of Bosnia and Herzegovina (ARBiH) from 19 December 1992, on St. Nicolas Day.

On 19 December 1992, Muslim soldiers attacked the village of Gornja Jošanica, where about 600 members of the BiH Army took part in the attack, in ten groups deployed to ten other Jošanica hamlets, which were wiped out.

The victims of the massacre included twenty-one women who were killed, and three children, ten-year-old Dragana Višnjić, her three year younger baby brother Dražen and two-year-old Danka Tanović. Victims were stabbed multiple times, had their throats slit and body parts mutilated. Some of the victims were tied up with wire and had their hands, feet and skulls crushed with blunt objects.

In 2012, the case was transferred to the District Public Prosecution in Trebinje who was said to be developing a case against sixty people. 

Witnesses to the tragedy claimed that Zaim Imamović, the former Bosnian commander was responsible for the 56 deaths in addition to burning 250 houses, an Orthodox church, and a cemetery.

References 

Massacres in the Bosnian War
Massacres in 1992
Massacres of Serbs
December 1992 events in Europe
1992 in Bosnia and Herzegovina
Army of the Republic of Bosnia and Herzegovina
Bosniak war crimes in the Bosnian War
Foča